Qareh Daraq (also known as Kara Darrekh, Qara Darreh, Qareh Darreh, and Qarrah Darreh) is a village in Golabar Rural District, in the Central District of Ijrud County, Zanjan Province, Iran. At the 2006 census, its population was 120, in 34 families.

References 

Populated places in Ijrud County